= Elizabeth, Kentucky =

Elizabeth, Kentucky may refer to several places:

- Hopkinsville, Kentucky, originally known as Elizabeth
- Elizabethtown, Kentucky, also formerly known as Elizabeth
